Lake Central Airlines Flight 527 was a regularly scheduled Convair 580 flight on March 5, 1967 from Chicago, Illinois to Detroit, Michigan with stops at Lafayette, Indiana, Cincinnati, Ohio, Columbus, Ohio and Toledo, Ohio. The aircraft crashed near Marseilles, Ohio, killing all 38 passengers and crew on board.

Synopsis

On March 5, 1967, Lake Central Airlines Flight 527 was scheduled from Chicago, Illinois to Detroit, Michigan. The flight, operated by one of the company's Convair 580 aircraft and flown by captain John W. Horn (45) and first officer Roger P. Skillman (33), left Chicago at 4:04 p.m. CST and proceeded normally to Lafayette, Cincinnati and Columbus. No problems were reported.

The aircraft was serviced in Columbus and departed at 7:52 p.m. EST for Toledo. Air traffic control requested that the flight report its descent and to report crossing . The crew acknowledged leaving 10,000 feet. This was the last transmission from the aircraft.

Witnesses in the vicinity of Marseilles, Ohio reported hearing sounds from an aircraft at times between 8:05 and 8:10 p.m. Some reported sounds similar to that of an engine starting. Shortly thereafter, the sound of an explosion was reported.

By 9:00 p.m., the authorities had confirmed that an aircraft had crashed in the area. Rain mixed with snow was reported at the time of the accident.

Cause

The aircraft was found to be loaded within normal limits, and the crew was found to be properly qualified for the flight, with no deficiencies reported.

The aircraft was equipped with a flight data recorder, which sustained no damage in the crash and was successfully read by investigators. Approximately 14 minutes after departing Columbus, the aircraft was on a heading of 322 degrees when it abruptly veered right 40 degrees, and then left 55 degrees, before power to the recorder was abruptly terminated. The cockpit voice recorder lost power at the same time, although investigators heard a sound resembling "the first few seconds of an air raid siren" just before shutoff.

The aircraft crashed in a farm field on a heading of 360 degrees. The right propeller was completely detached from the engine, as were the blades. In reconstructing the wreckage, the investigators discovered that the right propeller had separated during flight and severed the fuselage.

During manufacture, propeller pistons, which control the pitch of the propellers, are coated through a process called nitriding, which hardens them and increases their resistance to surface wear. They are supposed to be inspected to ensure that the process is completed, but investigators could not determine why N73130's propeller was not nitrided and did not fail inspections. During the life of the engine, the piston had been slowly wearing away. During the flight, the piston finally failed, causing the propeller to speed beyond its limits. The stress caused the propeller to fail one to two seconds later. When the propeller failed, the blades were hurled through the cabin, severing control cables and compromising the plane's structural integrity. The investigators determined that the crash was caused solely by the propeller defect and subsequent failure.

References

External links
 A detailed explanation of the propeller failure
Photo of N73130

Aviation accidents and incidents in the United States in 1967
1967 in Ohio
Airliner accidents and incidents in Ohio
Lake Central Airlines accidents and incidents
Airliner accidents and incidents caused by in-flight structural failure
Accidents and incidents involving the Convair CV-240 family
Transportation in Wyandot County, Ohio
March 1967 events in the United States